Alan Finney (born 31 October 1933) is a former footballer who played for Sheffield Wednesday and Doncaster Rovers, featuring in over 500 games during his time at Hillsborough and the consistency of his performances made a popular member of the team among the Club's supporters.

Football career
Alan Finney joined Wednesday from amateur football in 1949 and made his first team debut at the age of 17, against Chelsea in 1951. His first League goal came in a famous clash with Everton in May that year - the Owls thumped the Toffees 6-0 but both clubs were relegated to the second division having inferior goal averages to Chelsea. However, SWFC bounced straight back to the top flight as Division Two champions the following season, with Finney supplying the chances for a local discovery named Derek Dooley. Finney was a regular as the Club again won the Second Division Championship in 1955/56 and 1958/59 and also featured in every game of the FA Cup runs of 1954 and 1960, which saw Wednesday stumble at the semi-final hurdle. He was an ever-present during the 1960/61 campaign in which SWFC finished runners-up.

Finney had the ability to play on both wings and although he was chiefly a provider contributed his fair share in terms of goalscoring too. His form brought recognition for England at 'B' and Under-23 levels.

He signed for Doncaster Rovers in January 1966 for £5,000, scoring one goal in their Division 4 championship winning season, and two in the following relegation season before moving to Alfreton Town.

Trivia
It is of interest to note that Alan made his debut in the same game as Albert Quixall and not only were the two players partners on the right flank, they were also in the same unit while serving their national service.

References

External links
Profile at swfc.co.uk

1933 births
Living people
English footballers
England under-23 international footballers
Sheffield Wednesday F.C. players
Doncaster Rovers F.C. players
Alfreton Town F.C. players
Association football wingers